

National team

National Student Team
14th World University Futsal Championship 2014 in Málaga, Spain

Intercontinental Futsal Cup
The 15th edition of the world's premier club futsal tournament

UEFA Futsal Cup

Super League
25th Russian futsal championship 2014/2015

Regular season

Super League Playoffs

National Cup

Knockout stage

Eremenco Cup

Group stage

Final four

Top League

Top League regular season

Playoffs

Youth League

Championship

Doubles Cup

Women's League
23rd Russian women futsal championship 2014/2015

Women's National Cup

References

Russia
Seasons in Russian futsal
futsal